Race Hamilton, also known as the Labatt's Hamilton Championship, was a 1978 auto race held in Hamilton, Ontario, Canada featuring a round of the Formula Atlantic Labatt Championship Series.  The event featured future driving stars Bobby Rahal, Keke Rosberg and Danny Sullivan competing for $10,000 in first-place prize money.

The race attracted an estimated 60,000 fans, half of those watched for free from the roofs of surrounding buildings and by breaking down barriers. After a five-hour delay due to insurance issues with the safety barriers around the course, only 39 of the scheduled 73 laps took place due to darkness. Only 16 of the 29 cars entered, completed the race.

Race results

References

Sport in Hamilton, Ontario
Motorsport in Canada
Auto races in Canada
Defunct motorsport venues in Canada
1978 in Canadian motorsport
1978 in motorsport
August 1978 sports events in Canada